Heinrich Didier was a German emigrant to the United States of America and was one of the editors of the Deutsche Schnellpost in 1850.

References

German emigrants to the United States
American newspaper editors
German male non-fiction writers
19th-century American people